Neptunium (93Np) is usually considered an artificial element, although trace quantities are found in nature, so a standard atomic weight cannot be given. Like all trace or artificial elements, it has no stable isotopes.

Trace quantities are found in nature from neutron capture reactions by uranium atoms, a fact not discovered until 1951.

All of the remaining radioactive isotopes have half-lives that are less than 4.5 days, and the majority of these have half-lives that are less than 50 minutes. This element also has five meta states, with the most stable being  (t1/2 22.5 hours).

The primary decay mode before the most stable isotope, is electron capture (with a good deal of alpha emission), and the primary mode after is beta emission. The primary decay products before  are isotopes of uranium and protactinium, and the primary products after are isotopes of plutonium. Uranium-237 and neptunium-239 are regarded as the leading hazardous radioisotopes in the first hour-to-week period following nuclear fallout from a nuclear detonation, with 239Np dominating "the spectrum for several days."

List of isotopes 

|-
| 
| style="text-align:right" | 93
| style="text-align:right" | 126
| 219.03162(9)
| 0.15(+0.72-0.07) ms
| α
| 215Pa
| (9/2−)
|
|-
| 
| style="text-align:right" | 93
| style="text-align:right" | 127
| 220.03254(21)#
| 25(+14-7) μs
| α
| 216Pa
| 1-#
|
|-
| 
| style="text-align:right" | 93
| style="text-align:right" | 129
| 
| 380(+260-110) ns
| α
| 218Pa
| 1-#
|
|-
| 
| style="text-align:right" | 93
| style="text-align:right" | 130
| 223.03285(21)#
| 2.15(+100-52) μs
| α
| 219Pa
| 9/2−
|
|-
| rowspan=2|
| rowspan=2 style="text-align:right" | 93
| rowspan=2 style="text-align:right" | 131
| rowspan=2|224.03422(21)#
| rowspan=2|38(+26-11) μs
| α (83%)
| 220m1Pa
| rowspan=2|1-#
| rowspan=2|
|-
| α (17%)
| 220m2Pa
|-
| 
| style="text-align:right" | 93
| style="text-align:right" | 132
| 225.03391(8)
| 6(5) ms
| α
| 221Pa
| 9/2−#
|
|-
| 
| style="text-align:right" | 93
| style="text-align:right" | 133
| 226.03515(10)#
| 35(10) ms
| α
| 222Pa
|
|
|-
| rowspan=2|
| rowspan=2 style="text-align:right" | 93
| rowspan=2 style="text-align:right" | 134
| rowspan=2|227.03496(8)
| rowspan=2|510(60) ms
| α (99.95%)
| 223Pa
| rowspan=2|5/2−#
| rowspan=2|
|-
| β+ (.05%)
| 227U
|-
| rowspan=3|
| rowspan=3 style="text-align:right" | 93
| rowspan=3 style="text-align:right" | 135
| rowspan=3|228.03618(21)#
| rowspan=3|61.4(14) s
| β+ (59%)
| 228U
| rowspan=3|
| rowspan=3|
|-
| α (41%)
| 224Pa
|-
| β+, SF (.012%)
| (various)
|-
| rowspan=2|
| rowspan=2 style="text-align:right" | 93
| rowspan=2 style="text-align:right" | 136
| rowspan=2|229.03626(9)
| rowspan=2|4.0(2) min
| α (51%)
| 225Pa
| rowspan=2|5/2+#
| rowspan=2|
|-
| β+ (49%)
| 229U
|-
| rowspan=2|
| rowspan=2 style="text-align:right" | 93
| rowspan=2 style="text-align:right" | 137
| rowspan=2|230.03783(6)
| rowspan=2|4.6(3) min
| β+ (97%)
| 230U
| rowspan=2|
| rowspan=2|
|-
| α (3%)
| 226Pa
|-
| rowspan=2|
| rowspan=2 style="text-align:right" | 93
| rowspan=2 style="text-align:right" | 138
| rowspan=2|231.03825(5)
| rowspan=2|48.8(2) min
| β+ (98%)
| 231U
| rowspan=2|(5/2)(+#)
| rowspan=2|
|-
| α (2%)
| 227Pa
|-
| rowspan=2|
| rowspan=2 style="text-align:right" | 93
| rowspan=2 style="text-align:right" | 139
| rowspan=2|232.04011(11)#
| rowspan=2|14.7(3) min
| β+ (99.99%)
| 232U
| rowspan=2|(4+)
| rowspan=2|
|-
| α (.003%)
| 228Pa
|-
| rowspan=2|
| rowspan=2 style="text-align:right" | 93
| rowspan=2 style="text-align:right" | 140
| rowspan=2|233.04074(5)
| rowspan=2|36.2(1) min
| β+ (99.99%)
| 233U
| rowspan=2|(5/2+)
| rowspan=2|
|-
| α (.001%)
| 229Pa
|-
| 
| style="text-align:right" | 93
| style="text-align:right" | 141
| 234.042895(9)
| 4.4(1) d
| β+
| 234U
| (0+)
|
|-
| rowspan=2 style="text-indent:1em" |
| rowspan=2 colspan="3" style="text-indent:2em" | 
| rowspan=2|~9 min
| IT 
| 234Np
| rowspan=2|5+
| rowspan=2|
|-
| EC
| 234U
|-
| rowspan=2|
| rowspan=2 style="text-align:right" | 93
| rowspan=2 style="text-align:right" | 142
| rowspan=2|235.0440633(21)
| rowspan=2|396.1(12) d
| EC
| 235U
| rowspan=2|5/2+
| rowspan=2|
|-
| α (.0026%)
| 231Pa
|-
| rowspan=3|
| rowspan=3 style="text-align:right" | 93
| rowspan=3 style="text-align:right" | 143
| rowspan=3|236.04657(5)
| rowspan=3|1.54(6)×105 y
| EC (87.3%)
| 236U
| rowspan=3|(6−)
| rowspan=3|
|-
| β− (12.5%)
| 236Pu
|-
| α (.16%)
| 232Pa
|-
| rowspan=2 style="text-indent:1em" | 
| rowspan=2 colspan="3" style="text-indent:2em" | 60(50) keV
| rowspan=2|22.5(4) h
| EC (52%)
| 236U
| rowspan=2|1
| rowspan=2|
|-
| β− (48%)
| 236Pu
|-
| rowspan=3|
| rowspan=3 style="text-align:right" | 93
| rowspan=3 style="text-align:right" | 144
| rowspan=3|237.0481734(20)
| rowspan=3|2.144(7)×106 y
| α
| 233Pa
| rowspan=3|5/2+
| rowspan=3|Trace
|-
| SF (2×10−10%)
| (various)
|-
| CD (4×10−12%)
| 207Tl30Mg
|-
| 
| style="text-align:right" | 93
| style="text-align:right" | 145
| 238.0509464(20)
| 2.117(2) d
| β−
| 238Pu
| 2+
|
|-
| style="text-indent:1em" | 
| colspan="3" style="text-indent:2em" | 2300(200)# keV
| 112(39) ns
|
|
|
|
|-
| 
| style="text-align:right" | 93
| style="text-align:right" | 146
| 239.0529390(22)
| 2.356(3) d
| β−
| 239Pu
| 5/2+
| Trace
|-
| 
| style="text-align:right" | 93
| style="text-align:right" | 147
| 240.056162(16)
| 61.9(2) min
| β−
| 240Pu
| (5+)
| Trace
|-
| rowspan=2 style="text-indent:1em" | 
| rowspan=2 colspan="3" style="text-indent:2em" | 20(15) keV
| rowspan=2|7.22(2) min
| β− (99.89%)
| 240Pu
| rowspan=2|1(+)
| rowspan=2|
|-
| IT (.11%)
| 240Np
|-
| 
| style="text-align:right" | 93
| style="text-align:right" | 148
| 241.05825(8)
| 13.9(2) min
| β−
| 241Pu
| (5/2+)
|
|-
| 
| style="text-align:right" | 93
| style="text-align:right" | 149
| 242.06164(21)
| 2.2(2) min
| β−
| 242Pu
| (1+)
|
|-
| style="text-indent:1em" | 
| colspan="3" style="text-indent:2em" | 0(50)# keV
| 5.5(1) min
|
|
| 6+#
|
|-
| 
| style="text-align:right" | 93
| style="text-align:right" | 150
| 243.06428(3)#
| 1.85(15) min
| β−
| 243Pu
| (5/2−)
|
|-
| 
| style="text-align:right" | 93
| style="text-align:right" | 151
| 244.06785(32)#
| 2.29(16) min
| β−
| 244Pu
| (7−)
|

Actinides vs fission products

Notable isotopes

Neptunium-235
Neptunium-235 has 142 neutrons and a half-life of 396.1 days. This isotope decays by:
Alpha emission: the decay energy is 5.2 MeV and the decay product is protactinium-231.
Electron capture: the decay energy is 0.125 MeV and the decay product is uranium-235

This isotope of neptunium has a weight of 235.044 063 3 u.

Neptunium-236
Neptunium-236 has 143 neutrons and a half-life of 154,000 years. It can decay by the following methods:
Electron capture: the decay energy is 0.93 MeV and the decay product is uranium-236. This usually decays (with a half-life of 23 million years) to thorium-232.
Beta emission: the decay energy is 0.48 MeV and the decay product is plutonium-236. This usually decays (half-life 2.8 years) to uranium-232, which usually decays (half-life 69 years) to thorium-228, which decays in a few years to lead-208.
Alpha emission: the decay energy is 5.007 MeV and the decay product is protactinium-232. This decays with a half-life of 1.3 days to uranium-232.

This particular isotope of neptunium has a mass of 236.04657 u.

It is for this reason that despite its low critical mass and high neutron cross section, it has not been researched as a nuclear fuel in weapons or reactors. Nevertheless,  has been considered for use in mass spectrometry and as a radioactive tracer, because it decays predominantly by beta emission with a long half-life. The most favorable reactions to accumulate  were shown to be proton and deuteron irradiation of uranium-238.

Neptunium-237

 decays via the neptunium series, which terminates with thallium-205, which is stable, unlike most other actinides, which decay to stable isotopes of lead.

In 2002,  was shown to be capable of sustaining a chain reaction with fast neutrons, as in a nuclear weapon, with a critical mass of around 60 kg. However, it has a low probability of fission on bombardment with thermal neutrons, which makes it unsuitable as a fuel for light water nuclear power plants (as opposed to fast reactor or accelerator-driven systems, for example).

Inventory in spent nuclear fuel
 is the only neptunium isotope produced in significant quantity in the nuclear fuel cycle, both by successive neutron capture by uranium-235 (which fissions most but not all of the time) and uranium-236, or (n,2n) reactions where a fast neutron occasionally knocks a neutron loose from uranium-238 or isotopes of plutonium. Over the long term,  also forms in spent nuclear fuel as the decay product of americium-241.

 is considered to be one of the most mobile radionuclides at the site of the Yucca Mountain nuclear waste repository (Nevada) where oxidizing conditions prevail in the unsaturated zone of the volcanic tuff above the water table.

Raw material for  production

When exposed to neutron bombardment  can capture a neutron, undergo beta decay, and become , this product being useful as a thermal energy source in a radioisotope thermoelectric generator (RTG or RITEG) for the production of electricity and heat. The first type of thermoelectric generator SNAP (Systems for Nuclear Auxiliary Power) was developped and used by NASA in the 1960's and during the Apollo missions to power the instruments left on the Moon surface by the astronauts. Thermoelectric generators were also embarked on board of deep space probes such as for the Pioneer 10 and 11 missions, the Voyager program, the Cassini–Huygens mission, and New Horizons. They also deliver electrical and thermal power to the Mars Science Laboratory (Curiosity rover) and Mars 2020 mission (Perseverance rover) both exploring the cold surface of Mars. Curiosity and Perseverance rovers are both equipped with the last version of multi-mission RTG, a more efficient and standardized system dubbed MMRTG. 

These applications are economically practical where photovoltaic power sources are weak or inconsistent due to probes being too far from the sun or rovers facing climate events that may obstruct sunlight for long periods (like Martian dust storms). Space probes and rovers also make use of the heat output of the generator to keep their instruments and internals warm.

Shortage of  stockpiles

Stockpiles of   built up in the United States since the Manhattan Project, thanks to the Hanford nuclear complex (operating in Washington State from 1943 to 1977) and the development of atomic weapons, are now almost exhausted.

References 

 Isotope masses from:

 Isotopic compositions and standard atomic masses from:

 Half-life, spin, and isomer data selected from the following sources.

 
Neptunium
Neptunium